Sir Davidge Gould GCB (1758 – 23 April 1847) was an officer of the Royal Navy. He served during the American Revolutionary, French Revolutionary and the Napoleonic Wars, eventually rising to the rank of admiral. He was one of Vice-Admiral Horatio Nelson's Band of Brothers at the Battle of the Nile in 1798.

Family and early life
Gould was born at Bridgwater, Somerset, the son of the Richard Gould, of Wells. He was distantly related to the authors Henry and Sarah Fielding, and was the nephew of the naturalist William Gould. His uncle, Sir Henry Gould, was a Justice of the Common Pleas. Davidge joined the navy in May 1772, serving as a volunteer in the Mediterranean aboard . He later moved to the North American coast, where he was advanced to midshipman. He saw action in the American Revolutionary War, taking part in attacks on shore batteries and cutting out American ships.

Gould spent 13 months aboard the Pylades, during which time he was active in anti-smuggling operations. He then spent four years on half-pay, before being promoted to post-captain on 23 March 1789, and assigned to the command of the frigate .

Captaincy

During the action off Genoa, the Bedford came under fire from the Ça Ira and the Censeur, resulting in nine killed and seventeen wounded aboard the Bedford. He was still in command of Audacious when she was ordered to join Nelson's squadron in their search for the French. On 1 August, Gould commanded Audacious at the Battle of the Nile, engaging the French ship Conquérant and helped to force her surrender. Gould then took part in the blockades of Malta and Genoa for the rest of 1798 and into 1799.

Later life and flag rank
The Audacious escorted a convoy to Britain in late 1800, and on arrival was paid off. In spring 1801, Gould was appointed to command , serving in British waters, and in the West Indies. He commanded  in between 1803 and 1804 but was forced to resign command owing to ill-health. He never again served at sea. He was promoted to rear-admiral in October 1807, vice-admiral in July 1810 and admiral in May 1825. He was awarded a gold medal for his service at the Nile, and was invested as a Knight Commander of the Order of the Bath in 1815, followed by being invested as a Knight Grand Cross of the Order of the Bath in 1833. He was also appointed to the post of Vice-Admiral of the United Kingdom on 17 November 1846, a post he held until his death.

Personal life and death
Gould married Harriet Willes, eldest daughter of the Reverend William Willes, Archdeacon of Taunton, in 1803. The couple did not have any children. He received a pension of £300 per annum, and died at the age of 89 at Hawkshead, Hertfordshire on 23 April 1847. He was by then the last surviving member of Nelson's 'Band of Brothers', the captains who had fought with him at the Nile.

See also

Notes

References

1758 births
1847 deaths
Royal Navy admirals
Knights Grand Cross of the Order of the Bath
Royal Navy personnel of the American Revolutionary War
Royal Navy personnel of the French Revolutionary Wars
Royal Navy personnel of the Napoleonic Wars
People from Bridgwater